Upoto was a village on the right bank of the Congo River, now a district of Lisala in the Mongala province of the Democratic Republic of the Congo.

History

Captain Hanssens of the International Association of the Congo founded the Upoto station, on the right bank of the Congo above the confluence of the Mongala River, in June 1884.
A military post was founded there in 1888–1889 by a Belgian expedition led by Francis Dhanis.

Notes

Sources

Populated places in Tshopo